Raphael Luce is a French-American actor and stuntman.

He is known for playing the role of Young Henry Creel in the fourth season of Stranger Things (2022). His other notable roles include Young James Roosevelt in The First Lady (2022) and French Boy in Loki (2021).

Filmography

Film

Television

References

External links
 

Living people
21st-century American male actors
21st-century French male actors
American male child actors
French male child actors
American male film actors
French male film actors
American male television actors
French male television actors
American stunt performers
French stunt performers
Year of birth missing (living people)